Add the Blonde is the debut studio album by Polish singer Margaret. A pop record, it was influenced by retro-disco and ska, and by the work of Madonna. The album was produced by Joakim Buddee, Martin Eriksson, and Ant Whiting.

Add the Blonde was released on 26 August 2014, only in Poland. It consists of fourteen English-language tracks: eight new, and six previously included on Margaret's 2013 extended play (EP) All I Need. The album spawned three singles: "Wasted", "Start a Fire", and "Heartbeat". On 30 December 2014, Add the Blonde was released as a 12-inch vinyl, with altered tracklist.

The album's reissue was released exclusively to Biedronka on 19 September 2016, followed by its official release on 2 December. It included the singles "Cool Me Down" (and its three remixes) and "Elephant", and Margaret's Polish-language version of Robin Beck's song "First Time" titled "Smak radości" which was used in a Polish Coca-Cola commercial. On 23 December 2016, the "Special Limited Box" edition of the album was released to Empik. The box included its reissue and the 12-inch vinyl, as well as a 7-inch vinyl of "Heartbeat" (A-side) and "Cool Me Down" (B-side).

Add the Blonde reached number eight on the Polish Albums Chart, and was certified platinum by the Polish Society of the Phonographic Industry (ZPAV).

Track listing

Accolades

Charts

Certification

Release history

References

2014 debut albums
Margaret (singer) albums
Albums produced by Ant Whiting